Peadar Ó Guilín is an Irish novelist.

Life and work
Ó Guilín grew up in Donegal though he went to school in Clongowes Wood College in County Kildare. He is now based in Dublin where he works for a computer company. Raised speaking Irish and English, Ó Guilín is also fluent in French, and Italian. He has written a number of stories and novels. His first novel, The Inferior, was published to critical acclaim in 2007 and translations into nine languages including Japanese and Korean. Before writing novels, Ó Guilín wrote a number of plays and worked on a weekly print comic with the artist Laura Howell, Sneaky, the Cleverest Elephant in the World, aimed at kids.

The Times Educational Supplement called his first novel "a stark, dark tale, written with great energy and confidence and some arresting reflections on human nature."

Bibliography

References

Further reading

The Big Idea: Scalzi

Living people
Year of birth missing (living people)
People from County Donegal
21st-century Irish people
Irish male novelists